Ronald McKinnon Wood  (11 May 1892–22 October 1967) was a Labour Member of London County Council for Bethnal Green from 1946 to 1961. He served as Chairman of London County Council from 1957 to 1958.

The son of Thomas McKinnon Wood, he was educated at Highgate School, Merchant Taylors' School, Northwood and Pembroke College, Cambridge.

He married Gwendoline Elaine Dykes Spicer, daughter of Sir Albert Spicer, 1st Baronet in 1918. They had three children together.

References

1892 births
1967 deaths
People educated at Highgate School
People educated at Merchant Taylors' School, Northwood
Alumni of Pembroke College, Cambridge
Members of London County Council
Officers of the Order of the British Empire